DeepFlight Challenger is a one-person personal submarine deep submergence vehicle with full ocean depth capability. It is an "aero-submarine" which uses hydrodynamic forces to descend, as the sub has positive buoyancy, utilizing DeepFlight technology from Hawkes Ocean Technologies. The submarine is currently owned by Virgin Oceanic.

History
The submarine was designed by Graham Hawkes and Hawkes Ocean Technologies. It was originally ordered by Steve Fossett for an attempt on the Challenger Deep, to become the first solo dive there. Planning for the submarine started in 2000. It was put on the ordersheet in 2005, with a depth capability of 37,000 ft. The craft was named "Challenger" after the Challenger Deep by Fossett. At the time of the order, this would have doubled the depth that a single-place sub would be capable of going. It was to have been a "secret project" of Fossett's to be the first to solo the Challenger Deep, and was secret at the time of his death in 2007. The project was put on hold when Fossett died, and locked up in a warehouse at Hawkes Ocean Technologies, by the then owners, Fossett's estate, but was later revived when Chris Welsh of Deep Sub LLC bought the unfinished sub and restarted the program in 2010. Welsh had purchased the sub and the Cheyenne yacht from the Fossett estate for around $1 million. Virgin Oceanic came in as sponsors a year later in 2011. At the time of Fossett's death, the sub had been almost finished, only four weeks from dive tests  and delivery.

Had the sub been finished as scheduled, it would have been the first to return a solo manned mission to the Challenger Deep.

Design
The submarine uses composite technology to create a lightweight sub with great depth capabilities. The viewdome is made from quartz, while the rest of the pressure hull uses carbon/epoxy composites. The interface between dome and hull is by bonded titanium rings. The sub has a 24-hour endurance, 3kt bottom speed, and 350 ft/min dive rate. Without ballast attached, the sub is positively buoyant, it uses syntactic foam for buoyancy. The submarine does not have a temperature control system for the cabin, so will tend towards ambient temperature. The sub weighs 8000 lbs, and does not need a dedicated mothership. It has a 15 mi range, 6kt maximum speed, and 3-axis freedom of motion. It uses LED lighting instead of arc lights, and has a laser navigation system. The sub can dive to the bottom of the ocean and get back to the surface in 5 hours. The design draw from DeepFlight II, another Hawkes Ocean Technologies full depth submarine. The pressure hull is rated to withstand 20,000PSI (more than the 16,000PSI at the bottom of the Mariana Trench). The sub is smaller than James Cameron's Deepsea Challenger. Challenger represents the third generation of DeepFlight technology, one generation behind the DeepFlight Super Falcon.

Test program
 May 2007  Penn State Applied Research Laboratory Building; Pressure test of the pressure hull to Mariana Trench like pressures. Passed test, except for a crack in the viewdome due to a manufacturing defect.
 November 2007  cancelled tests, in the wake of Steve Fossett's death.
 February 2012  Alameda Naval Air Station (Oakland, California, US); Ballast system was tested. Submerged battery and engine testing, while manned.

Dive program

Five Dives project

Richard Branson and Chris Welsh of Virgin Oceanic plan on using DeepFlight Challenger to reach the deepest point of each of the world's five oceans, the Mariana Trench of the Pacific Ocean (36,201 ft), the Puerto Rico Trench of the Atlantic Ocean (28,232 ft), the Diamantina Trench of the Indian Ocean (26,401 ft), South Sandwich Trench of the Southern Ocean (23,737 ft), and Molloy Deep of the Arctic Ocean (18,399 ft). The Cheyenne yacht will be used as the mothership for the dive efforts.

It was planned that Branson would pilot the sub to the Puerto Rico Trench, while Chris Welsh would pilot it for the Mariana Trench dive. Virgin Oceanic had hoped to be the first team to solo to the bottom of the Mariana Trench, and first team to return to the Challenger Deep since the Bathyscaphe Trieste, the first submersible to dive to the Challenger Deep, left, however, James Cameron's Deepsea Challenge project beat them to it in March 2012. There has been an undeclared race on to return to the Challenger Deep between four teams, Cameron's, Virgin Oceanic's, Google-Schmidt/DOER's, and Triton Submarines'. The attempt on Challenger Deep had been announced in April 2011.

Based on testing at high pressure, the DeepFlight Challenger was determined to be suitable only for a single dive, not the repeated uses that had been planned as part of Virgin Oceanic service.  As such, in 2014, Virgin Oceanic "scrapped" plans for the five dives project using the DeepFlight Challenger, as originally conceived, putting plans on hold until more suitable technologies are developed.

Similar efforts 
As of February 2012, several other vehicles are under development to reach the same depths.  The groups developing them include:
Deepsea Challenge, a program created by James Cameron and National Geographic, using the submarine Deepsea Challenger, that carries a crew of one, and which became the second manned vehicle to reach Challenger Deep.
Triton Submarines, a Florida-based company that designs and manufactures private submarines, whose vehicle, Triton 36000/3, will carry a crew of three to the seabed in 120 minutes.
 Deep Ocean Exploration and Research (DOER) Marine, a San Francisco Bay Area based marine technology company established in 1992, that is developing a vehicle, Deepsearch (and Ocean Explorer HOV Unlimited), with some support from Google's Eric Schmidt with which a crew of two or three will take 90 minutes to reach the seabed, as the program Deep Search.

References

Further reading
 BBC News, Race to the bottom of the ocean: Virgin, 22 February 2012 (accessed 27 March 2012)

External links
 Virgin Oceanic, Sub
 Hawkes Ocean Technologies, DeepFlight Challenger
 CNet News, DeepFlight Challenger archive

Deep-submergence vehicles